Bill or William Gannon may refer to:
 Bill Gannon (New Hampshire politician), New Hampshire politician and State Senator
 Bill Gannon (Irish republican) (19021965), member of the Irish Republican Army
 Bill Gannon (baseball) (1873–1927), American baseball player
 A fictional character on the American television series Dragnet, played by Harry Morgan
 Bill Gannon (Gaelic footballer) (1901–1967), Irish Gaelic footballer
 William J. Gannon (born 1937), American politician in the state of Iowa